Unleashed is the fifth studio album by the American country music band Confederate Railroad. It was issued by Audium Entertainment (now E1 Music) in 2001. The album includes the singles "That's What Brothers Do" and "She Treats Her Body Like a Temple." The former peaked at #39 on the Hot Country Songs charts, and the latter reached #59 on the same.

Stewart Mason of Allmusic rated the album four stars out of five, saying that it showed the band's outlaw country influences and that the inclusion of ballads made the band "not just a bunch of retro-macho poseurs."

Track listing

Personnel

Confederate Railroad
 Jimmy Dormire - electric guitar
 Mark Dufresne - drums
 Cody McCarver - keyboards, background vocals
 Gates Nichols - steel guitar, background vocals
 Wayne Secrest - bass guitar
 Danny Shirley - acoustic guitar, lead vocals

Additional Musicians
 James Allan - background vocals
 Mark Beckett - drums, percussion
 J.T. Corenflos - electric guitar, baritone guitar
 Bob DiPiero - background vocals
 Aubrey Haynie - fiddle, mandolin
 John Hobbs - organ, piano, synthesizer
 Blue Miller - acoustic guitar
 Russ Pahl - banjo, dobro, steel guitar, slide guitar
 Michael Rhodes - bass guitar
 Harry Stinson - background vocals
 Bobby Terry - background vocals
 Craig Wiseman - background vocals
 Curtis Young - background vocals

Chart performance

References

2001 albums
Confederate Railroad albums
E1 Music albums
Albums produced by Barry Beckett